Jennu Kurumba, also known as Jen Kurumba, is a Southern Dravidian language of the Tamil–Kannada subgroup spoken by the Jennu Kurumba/Kattunayakan tribe. It is often considered to constitute a dialect of Kannada; however, Ethnologue classifies it as a separate language. Jennu Kurumba speakers are situated on the Nilgiri Hills cross-border area between Tamil Nadu and Karnataka, Mysore and Kodagu districts of Karnataka, and Wayanad district of Kerala.

See also
Betta Kurumba language
Alu Kurumba language
Dravidian languages
List of languages by number of native speakers in India
Languages of South Asia

References

Tamil languages
Languages of Kerala